{{DISPLAYTITLE:C16H18N2}}
The molecular formula C16H18N2 (molar mass: 238.33 g/mol) may refer to:

 Agroclavine
 Cycloclavine
 1-(2-Diphenyl)piperazine (RA-7)
 Metapramine
 Nomifensine

Molecular formulas